Fulgencio Santos "Jun" Factoran Jr. (November 3, 1943– April 5, 2020) was a Filipino lawyer, politician, human rights activist, pro-democracy activist, and advocate for freedom of the press in the Philippines. Factoran was a key opponent of the Ferdinand Marcos dictatorship. After the restoration of democracy, he served in the Cabinet of President Corazon Aquino as Secretary of Environment and Natural Resources (Philippines) (DENR) from 1987 to 1992. In 2018, Factoran was identified as a Motu Proprio victim of human rights violations during the Martial Law era by the Human Rights Victims Claims Board.

Early life and education
Fulgencio Santos Factoran was born on November 3, 1943 in Orion, Bataan to Fulgencio Factoran Sr. and Gloria Santos.

Factoran received both his Bachelor of Arts in humanities and Bachelor of Laws degrees from the University of the Philippines, where he was valedictorian of his law class. He then completed a Master of Law at Harvard Law School in the United States. A longtime lawyer, he was the managing partner of Factoran & Associates Law Offices in Manila.

Human rights advocacy during martial law 
During martial law under Ferdinand Marcos, Factoran and other human rights lawyers, including Jejomar Binay, formed the Movement of Attorneys for Brotherhood, Integrity, and Nationalism (MABINI) which opposed President Marcos' dictatorship.

Government service 
In the aftermath of the 1986 People Power Revolution which ousted Marcos, Factoran was appointed as deputy executive secretary to President Corazon Aquino from March 1986 to 1987.

He then served as Secretary of Environment and Natural Resources (Philippines) (DENR) in President Aquino's Cabinet from 1987 until 1992. During his tenure as DENR Secretary, Factoran revoked many of the logging concessions that had been awarded during Marcos' rule. He created new programs to promote reforestation efforts and reverse the extensive deforestation in the Philippines. He also transferred stewardship of forests to local residents and communities. Factoran opened the DENR archives to journalists, including Marites Vitug for her 1993 book "Power from the Forest: The Politics of Logging" to expose the abuses of the country's natural resources during the Marcos regime.

Later career 
He later served in leadership positions at several government-run corporations, including the National Electrification Administration and the Philippine National Oil Company.

Factoran had served on the board of directors for Rappler, a major Filipino online news site from 2018 until his death in 2020. He was also a member of the board for the Center for Media Freedom and Responsibility.

Death 
Jun Factoran died from a longtime illness on April 5, 2020, at the age of 76. He was predeceased by his wife, Kaye Mesina, and survived by their four children, Yazmin, Gertrude Anne, Fulgencio III, and Roberto Carlo.

References

1944 births
2020 deaths
Secretaries of Environment and Natural Resources of the Philippines
20th-century Filipino lawyers
Filipino democracy activists
Filipino human rights activists
University of the Philippines alumni
Harvard Law School alumni
People from Bataan